On June 1, 2011 Tennessee lawmakers passed a new bill that makes sharing login information for sites that provide music and movies, such as Netflix and Napster, illegal. The law, pushed for by recording industry professionals, is the first of its kind in that it is actually an update for a bill originally existing to punish cable theft now targeting the Internet. 

While the law punishes people for sharing passwords, it is really aimed at those sharing and selling their passwords in large quantities- up to $500 in theft resulting in a misdemeanor, and anything else after that a felony.

Reaction to the Law

Initial reaction to the law was negative from social network users. Many see the issue in the same light as with music piracy, the main idea being "I bought it, so I can do whatever I want with it."

References

External links 
 Tennessee General Assembly Mainpage

Tennessee law
2011 in American law
2011 in Tennessee